The Longford Club Hurling Championship is an annual Gaelic Athletic Association competition organised by Longford GAA among hurling clubs in County Longford, Ireland. The winner qualifies to represent the county in the Leinster Junior Club Hurling Championship, the winner of which progresses to the All-Ireland Junior Club Hurling Championship.

Currently three clubs compete in the County Championship: Wolfe Tones, Longford Slashers and Clonguish Gaels.

Titles won

(Longford Slashers played as 'Slashers Gaels' until the mid 2000's)

Roll of honour

- Longford Slashers played as Slashers Gaels until the mid 2000's

- 1905 county final was replayed following an objection

External links
Longford GAA Website
Longford Gaelic Stats

References

 
Hurling competitions in Leinster
Senior hurling county championships